is a 1955 musical comedy, written, devised, and directed by Robert Dhéry, with music by Gérard Calvi, and English lyrics by Ross Parker. The play consisted of a number of short sketches in English, French, and pantomime, satirizing French society. 

It opened firstly in 1955 at the Garrick Theatre, London, and closed after a run of two and a half years. It then transferred to the USA.

On Broadway, it was nominated for the Tony Award for Best Musical, and in three other categories, winning the 1959 Special Tony Award. Pierre Olaf was one of the show's leading actors.

It opened on Broadway at the Royale Theater on November 11, 1958 and closed on December 17, 1960 after a total of 835 performances.  Subsequently, the show toured to Las Vegas, Los Angeles and San Francisco during 1961.

Awards and nominations

Original Broadway production

References

External links
Internet Broadway Database listing
Time Magazine review, November 24, 1958

Broadway musicals
1958 musicals
Musicals by Gérard Calvi